Vincenzo Milazzo (born 5 April 1956, in Taranto, Italy) is an Italian naïve painter known for his use of reverse glass painting technique.

Biography 
Vincenzo Milazzo started painting using this technique since mid '70s Naïve participating in a long series of solo and group exhibitions, often bringing first prizes and special mentions.

He began exhibiting in Taranto and in the neighboring cities, participating in exhibitions at the ExpoArte of Bari and in private galleries in Martina Franca, the city in which he currently lives. Over the years he has collaborated on numerous initiatives for the rediscovery and cultural valorization of his land's traditions, which also are the main subject of his artistic representations.

In Italy he has exhibited his works at the literary center of Lazio and in several places in Emilia, the land of the Italian naïve art, where he exhibited his artworks in the Antoniano of Bologna, at the Santissima Annunziata, Parma, the Italian exhibition of naive painters of Carpi and the National Museum of Naïve Art 'Cesare Zavattini' in Luzzara.

The new millennium has seen the presence of his works abroad  first in the United States, in a solo exhibition at the Algonquin Club of Boston, inaugurated by the Italian Nobel laureate Franco Modigliani, and then in Japan, in Tokyo and Kurashiki, with the foundation Italia in Giappone.

Solo exhibitions
 2013 Exhibition "I paesaggi del cuore" in the ex-Cpi rooms in Locorotondo;
 (2002–present) Permanent exhibition at the Art Gallery La Lanterna in Martina Franca;
 2001 Kurashiki and Tokyo (Japan) with the Foundation Italy in Japan, Apulia Region - Department of Agriculture and A.PR.OLL;
 2001 Algonquin Club in Boston, USA;
 2000 Ducal Palaces' rooms in Martina Franca;
 (1996 - 1998) Permanent exhibition at his studio in Martina Franca;
 1994 Exhibition in La Nevaia Gallery in Martina Franca (Ta);
 1993 Pro-Loco Hall of Locorotondo, Bari;
 1992 Aragonese castle of Taranto;
 1991 Palazzo Galatone in Lecce;
 1990 Restaurant u Curdunne Locorotondo (Ba);
 1990 Municipal Hall of Ancona;
 1989 Salon of Società Artigiana in Martina Franca (Ta);
 1989 Pro-Loco Hall of Locorotondo, Bari;
 1988 Residence La Source, Portonovo, Ancona;
 1987 Pro-Loco Hall of Locorotondo, Bari;
 1987 Art Studio Scatigna in Martina Franca;
 1987 Literary Center of Lazio, Rome;
 1987 ExpoArte in Bari;
 1985 Academy Dioscures in Taranto ;
 1981 La Pietra Gallery in Martina Franca;
 1980 Subfor Gallery in Taranto;
 1979 La Pietra Gallery in Martina Franca;
 1978 La Pietra Gallery in Martina Franca;

Group exhibitions
 2000 National Award Festival of Naive Art Museum "Cesare Zavattini" Luzzara (RE);
 1999 Old Refectory of S.S. Annunziata, Parma;
 1998 National Award Festival of Naive Art Museum "Cesare Zavattini" Luzzara (RE);
 1998 UNICEF Zonal Conference - Municipal Library, Martina Franca;
 1998 Naif Review - Antonian of Bologna;
 1997 National Award Festival of Naive Art Museum "Cesare Zavattini" Luzzara (RE);
 1997 Naive Painters Exhibition - Carpi, Modena;
 1997 27th edition of the Giannino Grossi award for Naïve painters - Pro-Loco of Varenna, Lecco;
 1996 National Award Festival of Naive Art Museum "Cesare Zavattini" Luzzara (RE);
 1995 National Award Festival of Naive Art Museum "Cesare Zavattini" Luzzara (RE);
 1993 Painters in the historic center - Società Operaia lounge rooms, Martina Franca;
 1993 First Biennial of the Ionian Sea - Aragonese Castle, Taranto;
 1992 Sotto le stelle Gallery - Piazza Castello, Taranto;
 Summer 1990 Review - Piazza XX Settembre, Martina Franca;
 1987 Artists at the Napoleonic Fort - Portonovo, Ancona;
 1986 ExpoArte - Bari;
 1986 Review of painters from Martina - Public Library, Martina Franca;
 1985 XI Festival della Valle d'Itria - Cloister of San Domenico, Martina Franca;
 1985 Academy of Dioscures, Taranto ;
 1981 Exhibition of small format art - La Pietra Gallery, Martina Franca;
 1980 Art Exhibit City of Mottola - Mottola;
 Crispianart 1980 - Crispiano;
 1978 Art Exhibit City of Mottola - Mottola;
 1977 The Blessed Giles of Taranto - Convent of San Pasquale, Taranto ;

See also
Naive art
Reverse glass painting

External links

20th-century Italian painters
Italian male painters
Naïve painters
1956 births
Living people
20th-century Italian male artists